Jesse Levine was the defending champion, but lost to Frank Dancevic in the quarterfinals.Rhyne Williams defeated Robby Ginepri 7–5, 6–3 in the final to win the title.

Seeds

Draw

Finals

Top half

Bottom half

References
 Main Draw
 Qualifying Draw

Challenger of Dallas - Singles
2013 Singles